Tuthill-Lapham House, also known as Friendly Hall, is a historic home located at Wading River in Suffolk County, New York. The oldest section is a Federal style three story building with a gambrel roof, built around 1820.  Attached is an addition from 1838 and a two-story addition to the west dated 1869.  A kitchen wing was added in the 1920s.

It was added to the National Register of Historic Places in 2009.

References

Houses on the National Register of Historic Places in New York (state)
Houses completed in 1820
Federal architecture in New York (state)
Houses in Suffolk County, New York
National Register of Historic Places in Suffolk County, New York